The Hazel and Alice Sessions is an album by Laurie Lewis and the Right Hands. It earned the artists a Grammy Award nomination for Best Bluegrass Album.

References

2016 albums
Bluegrass albums